David Bek is an opera composed by Armen Tigranian based on the Raffi novel David Bek (1880–82). After the composer's death, the opera was completed by Levon Khoja-Eynatyan, G. Budaghyan, and the libretto was developed by Aram Ter-Hovhannisyan.

The opera describes events surrounding the historical figure of David Bek in the early 18th century and the struggle of the Armenian people against Persia and the Ottoman Turks. 

David Bek was first performed in Yerevan in 1950.

Recordings
 David's aria on Arias of Love & Sorrow Gevorg Hakobyan (baritone), Kaunas Symphony Orchestra, John Fisher, Constantine Orbelian 2023

References

Armenian music
Operas
Armenian-language operas
Operas by Armen Tigranian
Operas based on novels
Operas set in the 18th century
Operas set in Armenia
Cultural depictions of Davit Bek
Operas based on real people
Unfinished operas
1950 operas